Alessandro Parisi (born 21 September 1988 in Napoli, Italy) is an Italian footballer. He plays as a goalkeeper. He plays for Italian Lega Pro Seconda Divisione team Catanzaro.

References

Italian footballers
U.S. Catanzaro 1929 players
Living people
1988 births
Association football goalkeepers